The Spider and the Fly is a 1949 British crime film directed by Robert Hamer and starring Eric Portman, Guy Rolfe and Nadia Gray. The screenplay concerns an unusual love triangle that develops between two criminals and a policeman on the eve of the First World War. Hamer made it immediately after Kind Hearts and Coronets.

Plot
In 1913, Fernand Maubert, the dedicated chief of police of Paris, is pursuing Philippe Lodocq, a suave bank robber suspected of a series of thefts, but the criminal always has an alibi. After the latest robbery, Maubert does capture Lodocq's accomplice, Madeleine Saincaise.

When she is released from prison, Maubert warns her to stay away from Lodocq (though he has a certain admiration for the man). Impressed by her intelligence, beauty and courage, he begins to court her himself. When Lodocq visits her, she professes her love for him, but he tells her that it is too dangerous for them to be seen together and that they would eventually tire of each other anyway. Later, however, during one of their cordial occasional meetings, Maubert tells Lodocq that he can tell that Madeleine is different from Lodocq's other women; she has gotten under his skin.

Later, the police are tipped off by an informant and arrive during an attempted theft. Lodocq gets away, but his assistant Jean Louis is killed, along with a policeman. Lodocq persuades Madeleine to provide him with an alibi. Maubert knows she is lying, but cannot prove it. However, he does stop seeing her.

Finally, Maubert gets the break he has been waiting for. Lodocq employs Jean Louis's brother Alfred for his next theft. Maubert gets Alfred to betray Lodocq, not out of revenge for his brother's death, but by telling him falsely that Lodocq did not give his mother Jean's fair share of the loot. Lodocq is imprisoned just as World War I breaks out.

During the war, Maubert becomes a major in French counterintelligence. When the Minister of War tells him that they urgently need a list of German spies in France being kept in a safe in the German embassy in neutral Bern, Switzerland, Maubert states there is only one man for the job. Maubert is authorized to offer a pardon to Lodocq in exchange for his services. The prisoner agrees after Maubert dangles the prospect of seeing Madeleine.

The theft goes off without a hitch. However, when Lodocq goes to Madeleine's flat, he finds a despondent Maubert already there. In a surprise twist, it turns out that Madeleine's name was on the list they stole. She is taken away, with the implication that she will be executed for treason. In the final scene, Maubert watches Lodocq, now an anonymous French soldier, board a train for the intense fighting at Verdun, both knowing that Lodocq stands little chance of survival.

Cast

Production
It was the first film from the producing team of Maxwell Setton and Aubrey Baring, who set up their operation at Mayflower Pictures. Mayflower had been established by Charles Laughton and Eric Pommer in the 1930s and made three films but became dormant with the advent of World War Two. Setton and Baring decided to re-activate the company and the two men would make six movies together, most of which were written by Robert Westerby, who wrote The Spider and the Fly. Mayflower received a government grant to underwrite part of the cost. 

Robert Westerby's story was based on a true story which he had been told by a member of the French police.

(In October 1948 Alfred Hitchcock announced that he would make three films for Transatlantic Enterprises after he finished Under Capricorn: I Confess, Dark Duty and The Spider and the Fly.)

The leads were Eric Portman, Nadia Gray and Guy Rolfe. It was Eric Portman's first film in over a year, during which time he enjoyed a great success on stage in a double bill of Terence Rattigan plays called Playbill. Nadia Gray was a Romanian actor who had spent part of the war in a German concentration camp; she was cast in the film partly due to her appearance on the Paris stage in a production of Noël Coward's Present Laughter (she was seen by Anthony Havelock-Allan who recommended her). It was Guy Rolfe's third leading role.

Filming started in May 1949 and took place in Paris over three weeks, then at Pinewood studios in London. Sets were by the art director Edward Carrick. The period costumes were designed partly by Elizabeth Haffenden. It was Seth Holt's first film as lead editor, although he had worked as an assistant for a number of years.

Reception
The Monthly Film Bulletin said "The film falls between melodrama and something deeper - a study of human relationships. Though there are some tense scenes, it is as a whole not sufficiently exciting for a thriller, and Hamer's bitter intelligence is not quite sharp enough for a real drama of character."

References

External links

The Spider and the Fly at BFI

1949 films
British crime drama films
1949 crime drama films
Films directed by Robert Hamer
1949 romantic drama films
1940s historical romance films
British historical romance films
Films shot at Pinewood Studios
British romantic drama films
Films scored by Georges Auric
Films set in Paris
Films set in 1913
Films shot in Paris
1940s English-language films
1940s British films